Kim Yu-bin may refer to:

 Kim Yu-bin (musician) (born 1988), South Korean musician
 Kim Yoo-bin (actress) (born 2005), South Korean actress